Barulaganye Bolofete (born 12 December 1979) is a Botswana footballer. He currently plays as a midfielder for TASC FC. He two matches played for the Botswana national football team between 2001 and 2002.

External links
 

Association football midfielders
Botswana footballers
Botswana international footballers
1979 births
Living people
Extension Gunners FC players